The Ali Dome (Persian: گنبد عالی) is an 11th-century mausoleum tower in Abarkuh, Iran. It was listed among the national heritage sites of Iran in 1933 with the registration number of 195.

The mausoleum contains the burial place of Amir Shams ad-Dowleh ibn Ali Hezarasb who was a daylamite ruler and his mother, and was constructed by the order of his son, Firuzan, in 1056-1057 CE.

Gallery

References 

Towers in Iran
Tourist attractions in Yazd Province
Mausoleums in Iran
Daylamites